Siderolamprus enneagrammus, the Huaxteca lesser galliwasp, is a species of lizard of the Diploglossidae family. It is found in Mexico.

It was initially described in the genus Siderolamprus but was later moved to the genus Celestus. It was moved back to Siderolamprus in 2021.

References

Siderolamprus
Reptiles described in 1861
Endemic reptiles of Mexico
Taxa named by Edward Drinker Cope